Heteralcis bathroptila is a moth in the family Lecithoceridae. It was described by Edward Meyrick in 1929. It is found in Assam, India.

The wingspan is about 12 mm. The forewings are ochreous yellow with a large basal tuft of erect yellow-whitish scales. The markings are obscure, ill defined and yellow whitish, consisting of a broad fascia towards the base, a broad postmedian fascia interrupted in the middle, and an S-shaped streak from the disc at three-fourths to the apex. The hindwings are yellow whitish.

References

Moths described in 1929
Heteralcis
Taxa named by Edward Meyrick